The 2017–18 Wisconsin Badgers women's basketball team represented University of Wisconsin at Madison during the 2017–18 NCAA Division I women's basketball season. The Badgers, led by second-year head coach Jonathan Tsipis, played their home games at the Kohl Center as members of the Big Ten Conference. They finished the season 9–21, 2–14 in Big Ten play to finish in 13th place. They lost in the first round of the Big Ten women's tournament to Northwestern.

Previous season 
The Badgers finished the 2016–17 season 9–22, 3–13 in Big Ten play to finish in a four-way for 11th place. They defeated Rutgers in the first round of the Big Ten women's tournament before losing to Michigan State.

Roster

Schedule and results

|-
!colspan=9 style= | Exhibition

|-
!colspan=9 style=| Non-conference regular season

|-
!colspan=9 style=| Big Ten regular season

|-
!colspan=9 style="text-align: center; |Big Ten Conference Women's Tournament

Source

See also
2017–18 Wisconsin Badgers men's basketball team

References

Wisconsin Badgers women's basketball seasons
Wisconsin
Wisconsin Badgers women's basketball
Wisconsin Badgers women's basketball